St. Paul's Episcopal Church Complex may refer to:

St. Paul's Episcopal Church Complex (Patchogue, New York), listed on the National Register of Historic Places in Suffolk County, New York
St. Paul's Episcopal Church Complex (Troy, New York), listed on the National Register of Historic Places in Rensselaer County, New York

See also
St. Paul's Episcopal Church (disambiguation)